The Dark Place is a 2014 mystery-thriller film written and directed by Jody Wheeler. It stars Blaise Embry, Timo Descamps, Sean Paul Lockhart and Eduardo Rioseco. The film is a twisted thrill ride of betrayal, hope, greed, love — and mommy issues. Having a gay main character makes familiar worlds and genres become brand new landscapes.

Plot
Keegan Dark (Blaise Embry), the protagonist, has a condition called hyperthymesia, a condition that makes a person remember almost every single moment of their life. Keegan Dark and his boyfriend (Timo Descamps) arrive at the mansion of Keegan's estranged mother Mrs. Celeste Dark (Shannon Day) where not only is he constantly being haunted by his past, but also discovers a plot that puts his life and lives of his loved ones in danger. Along the way we meet Keegan's new step-father and step-brother (Andy Copeland and Sean Paul Lockhart) and his ex-boyfriend/Mrs. Dark's lawyer, Ernesto (Eduardo Rioseco).

Cast
 Blaise Embry ... Keegan Dark 
 Timo Descamps ... Wil Roelen
 Sean Paul Lockhart ... Jake Bishop
 Eduardo Rioseco ... Ernie Reyes
 Shannon Day ... Celeste Dark
 Andy Copeland ... Adrian Bishop
 Shade Streeter  ... Young Keegan
 Genevieve Buechner ... Wendy Luckenbill
 Allison Lane ... Sherriff Timmer
 Joshua Stenseth ... Collin Dark
 Jessica Hendrickson ... Lucinda
 Denny McAuliffe ... Young Ernie
 Kendall Wells ... Calvin
 Harold Phillips ... Steven Dark
 Ron Boyd ... Deputy Nelson

Production

Development
It is produced by  J.T. Tepnapa and Carlos Pedraza. It was produced by Blue Seraph Productions.

The film was shot in Hillsboro and Portland, Oregon, USA.

Reception

Reviews
Ed Kennedy from The Backlot said, "Refreshing... a real thriller with a beautiful setting, georgeous actors with complicated relationships". Timothy Junes of the Zizo Online commented, "'The Dark Place' is neither a masterpiece nor a monster of a film. It's refreshing to see where homosexuality is a given and no theme in itself. Entertaining".

Awards

References

External links
 
 
 

2014 films
American mystery thriller films
Films set in California
Gay-related films
2010s mystery thriller films
LGBT-related thriller films
2014 LGBT-related films
2010s English-language films
2010s American films